Aldo Ossola (born 13 March 1945) is an Italian former basketball player. At a height of 1.92 m (6'3 "), he was a point guard with a great ability to set the offensive rhythm and game tempo for his team. He is a member of the Italian Basketball Hall of Fame, inducted in 2008. His older brother, Luigi Ossola, played football professionally, in the Serie A, and another older half-brother Franco Ossola, was one of the highest all-time scorers of the Torino F.C.

On 3 February 2008, Ossola was chosen as one of the 50 Greatest EuroLeague Contributors, over the previous half-century, by the EuroLeague Basketball Experts Committee.

Club playing career
Ossola won, with the great Italian League club Ignis Varese of the 1970s, 5 FIBA European Champions Cup (EuroLeague) titles (1970, 1972, 1973, 1975, and 1976), and he also played in ten consecutive EuroLeague Finals (1970, 1971, 1972,  1973, 1974,  1975, 1976, 1977, 1978, and 1979), a record that is almost impossible to be broken.

Italy national team
Ossola was a member of the senior Italy national basketball team. With Italy's senior national team, he played at the EuroBasket 1969.

Awards and accomplishments
7× Italian League Champion: (1969, 1970, 1971, 1973, 1974, 1977, 1978)
4× Italian Cup Winner: (1969, 1970, 1971, 1973)
5× FIBA European Champions Cup (EuroLeague) Champion: (1970, 1972, 1973, 1975, 1976)
FIBA European Cup Winners' Cup (Saporta Cup) Champion: (1980)
2× FIBA Intercontinental Cup Champion: (1970, 1973)

References

External links
 FIBA Archive Profile
 Euroleague.net 50 Greatest Contributors

1945 births
Living people
Italian men's basketball players
Pallacanestro Milano 1958 players
Pallacanestro Varese players
Point guards